This is a list of town tramway systems in Spain by the autonomous community.  It includes all tram systems, past and present. Cities with current operating systems, and those systems themselves, are indicated in bold and blue background colored rows. The use of the diamond (♦) symbol indicates where there were (or are) two or more independent tram systems operating concurrently within a single metropolitan area.  Those tram systems that operated on other than standard gauge track (where known) are indicated in the 'Notes' column.

Andalucia

Aragon

Asturias

Balearic Islands

Basque Country

Canary Islands

Cantabria

Castile and León

Catalonia

Extremadura

Galicia

Madrid

Region of Murcia

Navarre

Valencian Community

See also

 Trams in Spain
 List of town tramway systems in Europe
 List of tram and light rail transit systems
 List of metro systems
 List of trolleybus systems in Spain

References

Bibliography
Books, Periodicals and External Links

Spain
Tramways